Sándor Barcs (10 November 1912 – 7 January 2010) was a Hungarian journalist, politician, sports executive and amateur footballer. He was the Acting President of UEFA between July 1972 and March 1973. In 2003, Sándor Dorogi, on behalf of the MTI news agency, presented him with the "Golden Ring" award, which met with a divided response in journalistic circles due to the honoree's not uncontroversial political past (he was, among other things, a presiding judge at the show trial and co-signer of the death sentence against László Rajk).

References

|-

|-

1912 births
2010 deaths
People from Szeged
People from the Kingdom of Hungary
Independent Smallholders, Agrarian Workers and Civic Party politicians
Members of the Hungarian Socialist Workers' Party
Members of the National Assembly of Hungary (1947–1949)
Members of the National Assembly of Hungary (1949–1953)
Members of the National Assembly of Hungary (1953–1958)
Members of the National Assembly of Hungary (1958–1963)
Members of the National Assembly of Hungary (1963–1967)
Members of the National Assembly of Hungary (1967–1971)
Members of the National Assembly of Hungary (1971–1975)
Members of the National Assembly of Hungary (1975–1980)
Members of the National Assembly of Hungary (1980–1985)
Members of the National Assembly of Hungary (1985–1990)
Presidents of UEFA
Association football executives
Hungarian journalists